The 2009–10 season was the first season under new coach Mario Been. The former Feyenoord striker was manager of NEC, and has been assistant-coach of Bert van Marwijk at Feyenoord in the past. Feyenoord welcomed five new players: Dani Fernández joined on a free transfer from NEC; Sekou Cissé signed a four-year deal after his transfer from Roda JC, Kamohelo Mokotjo came over from SuperSport United; and loan agreements were made with Borac Čačak for Aleksandar Ignjatović and with Nantes for Stefan Babović.

Pre-season 
Feyenoord began the pre-season with a 5–0 win against the amateurs of SC Feyenoord. Feyenoord then played the amateurs of BVV Wit-Rood-Wit (1–10 win), BVV Barendrecht (0–2 win) and BSV Limburgia (0–12 win).
The first serious test came against VVV-Venlo on July 11 for the Herman Teeuwen Bokaal. The game ended in a 2–2 draw, but VVV-Venlo proved the better at the penalty-shoot-out and claimed the trophy.
Feyenoord won a friendly against Sporting CP in Lisbon with 1–2, before ending their pre-season preparations with a 3–0 home win against Italian side Sampdoria.

Competitions

Overall

Eredivisie

League table

Results summary

Matches

KNVB Cup

Friendlies

Player details

Transfers

In:

Out:

Club

Coaching staff

Kit

|
|
|
|
|

References

Feyenoord seasons
Dutch football clubs 2009–10 season